Manakara Airport  is an airport in Manakara, Fitovinany, Madagascar, located on the east coast on the island.

The Fianarantsoa-Côte Est railway crosses the runway of this airport, making it is one of only a few airports in the world that crosses a live railway line. The other two airports are Peshawar Airport in Pakistan and Gisborne Airport in New Zealand.

Airlines and destinations

References

Airports in Madagascar